Brandon Boggs (born May 2, 1992) is an American professional basketball player for Club Social y Deportivo Urupan of the Liga Uruguaya de Básquetbol.

Early life
Boggs was born in Greenville, South Carolina.

Professional career
During the 2015–16 season, Boggs played for the Kongsberg Miners and averaged 20.5 points and 6.6 rebounds per game. In 2016, he signed with the Bristol Flyers and played two seasons with the team. In August 2020, Boggs signed with Kharkivski Sokoly of the Ukrainian Basketball Superleague. He averaged 10 points, 2.9 rebounds and 1.7 assists per game. On September 15, 2021, Boggs signed with Club Social y Deportivo Urupan of the Liga Uruguaya de Básquetbol.

References

External links
Western Carolina Catamounts bio

1992 births
Living people
American expatriate basketball people in the Czech Republic
American expatriate basketball people in Finland
American expatriate basketball people in Norway
American expatriate basketball people in Ukraine
American expatriate basketball people in the United Kingdom
American expatriate basketball people in Uruguay
American men's basketball players
Basketball players from North Carolina
BC Kharkivski Sokoly players
BK NH Ostrava players
Bristol Flyers players
Small forwards
Sportspeople from Greenville, South Carolina
Western Carolina Catamounts men's basketball players
American expatriate sportspeople in England